Anthony Lamont "A. J." Walton (born December 28, 1990) is an American professional basketball player for Peja in the Kosovo Basketball League.

Honors
PLK Best Defender (2014)

References

External links
Baylor Bears bio

1990 births
Living people
American expatriate basketball people in Poland
American expatriate basketball people in Slovakia
American men's basketball players
Asseco Gdynia players
Astoria Bydgoszcz players
AZS Koszalin players
Basketball players from Arkansas
Baylor Bears men's basketball players
BK Iskra Svit players
Hall High School (Arkansas) alumni
Point guards
Sportspeople from Little Rock, Arkansas